National Secondary Route 146, or just Route 146 (or ) is a National Road Route of Costa Rica, located in the Alajuela province.

Description
In Alajuela province the route covers Alajuela canton (Sabanilla district), Poás canton (San Pedro, San Juan, Sabana Redonda districts).

References

Highways in Costa Rica